Mountain Laurel or mountain laurel may refer to:

Plants
 Calia secundiflora, Texas mountain laurel
 Cryptocarya nova-anglica from eastern Australia
 Kalmia latifolia, from eastern North America
 Umbellularia californica, from north-western North America

Places

Other
 Mountain Laurel Autoharp Gathering, an annual event in Newport, Pennsylvania

See also
 Laurel Mountain (disambiguation)